Maurice Roatin was mayor of Poitiers in France, from 1594 to 1595.

People from Poitiers
Year of birth missing
Year of death missing
Mayors of places in Nouvelle-Aquitaine